DeRo TFC (formerly DeRo United Futbol Academy) is Canadian soccer academy founded in 2012 by former Canadian professional soccer player Dwayne De Rosario based in the Scarborough district of Toronto, Ontario. They previously fielded  a Canadian women's semi-professional soccer club that played in the League1 Ontario women's division.

History

The academy was founded in 2012 by Dwayne De Rosario to foster development for youth soccer players of both genders.

In 2018, they added a semi-professional team in the women's division of League1 Ontario with the core of their roster featuring many U21, university varsity, and post-university players of high quality. Peyvand Mossavat was named the semi-pro team's head coach. They defeated Durham United FA 2–0 on April 27 in their debut league match. They finished in sixth place in their inaugural season, narrowly missing a playoff berth. They were not listed as returning for the 2020 season.

In June 2021, the club became an official affiliate team of De Rosario's former club Toronto FC, joining their academy system and re-branded as DeRo TFC.

Seasons 
Women

Notable players
 Vital Kats
 Nicole Kozlova

References

Association football clubs established in 2012
Soccer clubs in Toronto
Scarborough, Toronto
League1 Ontario teams
Women's soccer clubs in Canada
2012 establishments in Ontario
Toronto FC